Henrik Gál (born 5 March 1947 in Földes) is a Hungarian former wrestler who competed in the 1972 Summer Olympics and in the 1976 Summer Olympics.

References

External links
 

1947 births
Living people
Olympic wrestlers of Hungary
Wrestlers at the 1972 Summer Olympics
Wrestlers at the 1976 Summer Olympics
Hungarian male sport wrestlers